Wengraf is a surname. Notable people with the surname include:

John Wengraf (1897–1974), Austrian actor
Senta Wengraf (1924–2020), Austrian actress